Xuxa só Para Baixinhos 2 (also known as XSPB 2) is the twenty-fourth studio album and the seventeenth in Portuguese by singer and Brazilian presenter Xuxa, released by Som Livre on September 5, 2001. It is the second album in the collection Só Para Baixinhos.

Release and reception
Xuxa só Para Baixinhos 2, was released on September 5, 2001, first in the CD and VHS version and released on DVD shortly thereafter, it was reissued in VHS version in 2002, it was remastered and released on independent CD in 2008. The singles were "Dançando Com o Txutxucão", "Cinco Macaquinhos" and "Vem Que eu Vou te Ensinar".

The album sold more than 50,000 copies in DVD, yielding double gold disc and 500,000 in CD yielding double platinum.

This disc reached the second position among the best sellers of 2001. With XSPB 2, Xuxa wins its first Latin Grammy Award for Best Latin Children's Album in 2002.

Awards

Latin Grammy Awards
At the 3rd Annual Latin Grammy Awards in 2002, the album received one awards:

Latin Grammy Award for Best Latin Children's Album

Track listing

Personnel

Art Direction: Xuxa Meneghel
General direction: Marlene Mattos
Production: Zé Henrique
Production Director: Ângela Matos
Production Assistant: Ana Paula Guimarães
Verson of Music: Vanessa Alves
Recorded in studios: Cinédia
Direction: José Mario
Director of Photography: Luiz Leal
Choreographies: Fly
Cast: Vanessa Alves (pink mouse), Alexandra Richter (yellow mouse), Marcelo Torreão (blue mouse)
Costume designer: Marcelo Cavalcante
Description: Vavá Torres/ Mário Campioli
Hair And Makeup: Edson Freitas
Scenography and Art Production: Lueli Antunes
Technical Coordinator: Alfredo Campos
Sonoplasty: Leonardo da Vinci
Edition: Jorge Rui
Production Assistant: Ana Paula Faria

Certifications

References

External links 
 Xuxa só para Baixinhos 2 at Discogs

2001 albums
2001 video albums
Xuxa albums
Xuxa video albums
Latin Grammy Award for Best Latin Children's Album
Portuguese-language video albums
Portuguese-language albums
Som Livre albums